Alex Drum Hawkes  (1927–1977) was an American botanist and cookbook author who lived in Coconut Grove, Florida & Kingston, Jamaica. Alex specialized in orchids, bromeliads, palm trees, fruits, vegetables, and nuts. Named the orchid genera Flickingeria, and Paraphalaenopsis and travelled the world extensively, particularly the Caribbean & Latin America during the 1940s - 1970s collecting plants and authentic regional recipes.

Publications

Cookbooks and recipes 
 Editor of The Horticulture Publications, Coconut Grove, Florida
 Editor of COOKERY NOTES (1960s-70s) Coconut Grove, Florida (FL.) Recipes by Alex D. Hawkes 
 South Florida Cookery: Unique Recipes from the Tropics and Elsewhere (1964) Wake-Brook House, Coral Gables, Florida
 Tropical Cookery (1960s)
 The Shrimp Cookbook: 140 Wonderful Ways To Serve Shrimp (1966) Culinary Arts Institute, Chicago, Illinois
 A World of Vegetable Cookery: An encyclopedic treasury of recipes, botany, and lore of the vegetable kingdom (1968) Simon & Schuster, New York [Rev. ed. 1984] illustrations by Bill Goldsmith
 Cooking with vegetables : an encyclopedic treasury of recipes, botany, and lore of the vegetable kingdom (REVISED)
 Eating Out in Jamaica: A Unique Guide to Good Eating (1971) DMP Publications Ltd., Kingston, Jamaica 
 The Rum Cookbook (1972) William Collins & Sangster, Jamaica Photography by Maria LaYacona
 The Flavors of The Caribbean & Latin America: a personal collection of recipes (1977) Viking, New York illustrations by Lynda West Compiled & Foreword by Elisabeth Lambert Ortiz

Botanical works 
 The Gardener's Pocketbook (1950) The National Horticultural Magazine
 The Major Kinds of Palms (1950 - 1952) Fairchild Tropical Garden, Coconut Grove / Coral Gables, Florida
 The Orchid Journal An International Review of Orchidology (1952 - 1953) Berkeley, California - Official Publication of The International Orchid Society
 Orchid Weekly (1958-1967) The Horticulture Publications, Coconut Grove, Florida 
 Palm Papers (1950s) The Horticulture Publications, Coconut Grove, Florida
 Bromeliad Papers (1958-1967) The Horticulture Publications, Coconut Grove, Florida 
 Tropical Plants (1950s-1960s) The Horticulture Publications, Coconut Grove, Florida
 Cultural Directions For Orchids (1959) The Horticultural Publications 
 Orchids Their Botany & Culture (1961) Harper & Brothers, New York
 Tropics Magazine (1962) © Alex D. Hawkes (The Horticulture Publications, Coconut Grove, Florida) 
 The Four Arts Garden : history and catalogue of the labeled plants (1964) Garden Club of Palm Beach, Florida
 Encyclopedia of Cultivated Orchids, an illustrated descriptive manual of the members of the Orchidaceae currently in cultivation (1965) Faber & Faber, London
 Guide to Plants of the Everglades National Park (1965) Tropic Isle Publishers, Coral Gables, Florida
 A Plantman's Guide to Jamaica (1969)
 Wild Flowers of Jamaica (1974) Collins & Sangster, Great Britain illustrations by Brenda C. Sutton
 Illustrated Plants of Jamaica (1974) J. Wray & Nephew, Jamaica

Hommages 
The following plants or genera were named by Alex D. Hawkes or in his honor:
 Genera
 (Orchidaceae)  Flickingeria
 (Orchidaceae) Grafia (now Phalaenopsis)
 (Orchidaceae) Helleriella
 (Orchidaceae) Hellerorchis
 (Orchidaceae) Katherinea
 (Orchidaceae) Mendoncella
 (Orchidaceae) Paraphalaenopsis

 Hybrids
{| 
|
 (Bromeliaceae) Neoregelia 'Alex D. Hawkes' tristis X marmorata Flickinger, 1960
 (Orchidaceae) Brassavola 'Yaki' Brassavola cucullata × B. nodosa A.D.Hawkes, 1946
 (Orchidaceae) Cymbidium 'Katherine Hawkes Chatham' Cym. Dainty × Cym. floribundum A.D.Hawkes, 1964
 (Orchidaceae) Encyclia 'Alex Hawkes' Encyclia oncidioides × Encyclia diurna Moir, 1969
 (Orchidaceae) Prosavola 'Alex Hawkes' Brassavola nodosa x Prosthechea mariae Flickinger, 1964
 (Orchidaceae) Renanthera 'Alex Hawkes' Renanthera coccinea x Renanthera storiei Moir, 1954 
 (Orchidaceae) × Rhyncholaeliocattleya 'Alex Hawkes' Rhyncholaeliocattleya cliftonii x Cattleya Mount Royal Wright, 1949 

 Species
{| 
|
 (Orchidaceae) Aporum hendersonii syn. Dendrobium hendersonii syn. Dendrobium rudolphii A.D.Hawkes & A.H.Heller, 1957
 (Orchidaceae) Dendrobium garayanum A.D.Hawkes & A.H.Heller, 1957
 (Orchidaceae) Dendrobium hawkesii A.H.Heller, 1957
 (Orchidaceae) Dendrobium hellerianum A.D.Hawkes, 1957
 (Orchidaceae) Epidendrum hawkesii A.H.Heller, 1966
 (Orchidaceae) Epidendrum hellerianum A.D.Hawkes, 1966
 (Orchidaceae) Helleriella nicaraguensis A.D.Hawkes, 1966
 (Orchidaceae) Hellerorchis handroi syn. Gomesa handroi syn. Rodrigueziella handroi A.D.Hawkes, 1959
 (Orchidaceae) Hellerorchis gomezioides (Barb.Rodr.) syn. Gomesa gomezoides A.D.Hawkes, 1959
 (Orchidaceae) Lepanthes helleri A.D.Hawkes, 1966
 (Orchidaceae) Mycaranthes hawkesii A.H.Heller, 1983
 (Orchidaceae) Pecteilis hawkesiana King & Pantl., 2003
 (Orchidaceae) Pleurothallis helleri A.D.Hawkes, 1966
 (Orchidaceae) Pleurothallis hawkesii syn. Restrepia brachypus A.D.Hawkes, 1963
 (Orchidaceae) Sobralia hawkesii A.H.Heller, 1966
 (Orchidaceae) Sobralia helleri A.D.Hawkes, 1966
 (Orchidaceae) Tolumnia hawkesiana Moir, 1986
 (Orchidaceae) Vanilla helleri A.D.Hawkes, 1966
 (Moraceae) Coussapoa cayennensis A.D.Hawkes, 1948

References

20th-century American botanists
American cookbook writers
American food writers
American television chefs
American male chefs
1927 births
1977 deaths
Caribbean cuisine
Cuban cuisine
Mexican cuisine
Latin American cuisine